Erlangen is an electoral constituency (German: Wahlkreis) represented in the Bundestag. It elects one member via first-past-the-post voting. Under the current constituency numbering system, it is designated as constituency 242. It is located in northern Bavaria, comprising the city of Erlangen and the district of Erlangen-Höchstadt.

Erlangen was created for the inaugural 1949 federal election. Since 2002, it has been represented by Stefan Müller of the Christian Social Union (CSU).

Geography
Erlangen is located in northern Bavaria. As of the 2021 federal election, it comprises the independent city of Erlangen, the district of Erlangen-Höchstadt, and the Verwaltungsgemeinschaft of Uehlfeld from the district of Neustadt (Aisch)-Bad Windsheim.

History
Erlangen was created in 1949. In the 1949 election, it was Bavaria constituency 31 in the numbering system. In the 1953 through 1961 elections, it was number 226. In the 1965 through 1998 elections, it was number 228. In the 2002 and 2005 elections, it was number 243. Since the 2009 election, it has been number 242.

Originally, the constituency comprised the independent city of Erlangen and the districts of Landkreis Erlangen, Fürth, Neustadt an der Aisch, and Scheinfeld. In the 1965 through 1972 elections, it comprised the city of Erlangen and the districts of Landkreis Erlangen, Landkreis Nürnberg, Hersbruck, and Lauf an der Pegnitz. In the 1976 through 1987 elections, it comprised the city of Erlangen and the districts of Nürnberger Land and Erlangen-Höchstadt excluding the municipalities of Aurachtal and Herzogenaurach. In the 1990 through 2017 elections, it comprised the city of Erlangen and the district of Erlangen-Höchstadt. It acquired its current borders in the 2021 election.

Members
The constituency has been held by the Christian Social Union (CSU) during all but three Bundestag terms since its creation. It was first represented by Willibald Mücke of the Social Democratic Party (SPD) from 1949 to 1953. Werner Dollinger of the CSU won it in 1953, and served until 1965. Adalbert Hudak of the CSU then served one term. Dieter Haack of the SPD was elected in 1969 and was representative until 1976, when Klaus Hartmann won it for the CSU. He was succeeded in 1987 by Gerhard Friedrich. Stefan Müller was elected in 2002, and re-elected in 2005, 2009, 2013, 2017, and 2021.

Election results

2021 election

2017 election

2013 election

2009 election

References

Federal electoral districts in Bavaria
1949 establishments in West Germany
Constituencies established in 1949
Erlangen
Erlangen-Höchstadt
Neustadt (Aisch)-Bad Windsheim